David Marusek (born January 21, 1951 in Buffalo, New York) is an American author.

Biography
Marusek worked as a graphic designer for about twenty years and for eleven years he also taught graphic design at the University of Alaska Fairbanks. He became serious about a writing career around 1986; success began soon after he attended Clarion West in 1992. His third published story, "We Were Out of Our Minds with Joy," garnered attention. In 1999 his novella "The Wedding Album" won the Theodore Sturgeon Award and was nominated for the Nebula Award for Best Novella. His first novel, Counting Heads (a much bigger expansion of "...Joy"), was published by Tor Books in 2005, and was the subject of Dave Itzkoff's debut "Across the Universe" column in the March 5, 2006 The New York Times.

A second novel titled Mind Over Ship (a sequel to Counting Heads) was released by Tor Books on January 20, 2009. A short story collection, Getting to Know You, was published by Subterranean Press in 2007 and was reprinted by Del Rey Books in 2008.

A new novel titled Upon This Rock: Book 1--First Contact (Volume 1) was released on June 29, 2017, followed by two more volumes: Upon this Rock: Book 2--Glassing the Orgachine on February 2, 2019, and Upon this Rock: Book 3--Consider Pipnonia on June 18, 2021.

Personal life

Marusek lived in various places in youth. He is divorced. He has a daughter. He has lived in Alaska since 1973 and that is the state he is most associated with.

Works

Short fiction 
"The Earth Is on the Mend" (1993) 
"She Was Good--She Was Funny" (1994) 
"We Were Out of Our Minds with Joy" (1995) 
"Getting to Know You" (1998) 
"Yurek Rutz, Yurek Rutz, Yurek Rutz" (1999) 
"Cabbages and Kales, or, How We Downsized North America" (1999) 
"The Wedding Album" (1999)
"VTV" (2000) 
"A Boy in Cathyland" (2001) 
"Listen to Me" (2003)
"My Morning Glory"(2006)
"HealthGuard" (2007)
"Osama Phone Home"(2007)

Novels

Counting Heads (2005)
Mind Over Ship (2009)
Upon This Rock: Book 1 — First Contact (2017)
Upon This Rock: Book 2 — Glassing the Orgachine (2019)
Upon This Rock: Book 3 — Consider Pipnonia (2021)

Collections

Getting to Know You (2007)

References

External links
Personal site
Counting Heads blog
Locus interview excerpt
Links to a selection of reviews

Living people
21st-century American novelists
American male novelists
American science fiction writers
Writers from Buffalo, New York
Writers from Alaska
American male short story writers
1951 births
21st-century American short story writers
21st-century American male writers
Novelists from New York (state)